The 2011 season was Busan I'Park's twenty-ninth season in the K-League in South Korea. Busan I'Park competed in K-League, League Cup and Korean FA Cup.

Current squad

Match results

K-League

League table

Results summary

Results by round

K-League Championship

Korean FA Cup

League Cup

Squad statistics

Appearances and goals
Statistics accurate as of match played 20 November 2011

Top scorers

Top assistors

Discipline

Transfer

In
 7 July 2011 –  Yoo Ji-Hoon – Gyeongnam FC
 8 July 2011 –  Lee Se-In – Changchun Yatai F.C.
 12 July 2011 –  Hwang Jae-Hun – Daejeon Citizen
 14 July 2011 –  Lee Dong-Won – Ulsan Hyundai FC
 20 July 2011 –  Éder Baiano – Rio Preto (loan)
 20 July 2011 –  Fagner – Salgueiro (loan)
 28 July 2011 –  Lee Sung-Woon – Daejeon KHNP

Out
 14 June 2011 –  Bas van den Brink – Free Agent
 14 June 2011 –  Tássio – Free Agent
 14 June 2011 –  Felipe Azevedo – Free Agent
 7 July 2011 –  Lee Sang-Hong – Released (under arrest)
 7 July 2011 –  Hong Seong-Yo – Released (under indictment)
 7 July 2011 –  Kim Eung-Jin – Released (under indictment)
 7 July 2011 –  Lee Jung-Ho – Released (under indictment)
 12 July 2011 –  Noh Yong-Hun – Daejeon Citizen
 14 July 2011 –  Park Woo-Hyun – Gangwon FC

References

South Korean football clubs 2011 season
2011